The Good Father is a 1985 British film directed by Mike Newell and starring Anthony Hopkins, Jim Broadbent, Harriet Walter, Fanny Viner, Simon Callow, Joanne Whalley, and Michael Byrne. It is loosely based on Peter Prince's 1983 novel of the same name. It marked the first credited appearance in a feature film of Stephen Fry. The film was produced for British television but received a theatrical release in the US.

Plot 
Bill (Hopkins) is a man who is bitter about his recent divorce from his wife and the loss of custody of his only child. He acts out his anger by befriending another man, Roger (Broadbent), who has been sued for divorce by his wife, so that she can enter into a lesbian relationship with her lover. Bill tries to help the man out, by funding the latter's court case to regain custody of his child. Simon Callow plays an unscrupulous and sleazy barrister hired for the case. Soon Bill, who has focused his anger against feminism which he blames for robbing him of his family, begins to feel disgust for what he and his new friend are doing.

Cast
 Anthony Hopkins as Bill Hooper
 Jim Broadbent as Roger Miles
 Harriet Walter as Emmy Hooper
 Frances Viner as Cheryl Langford
 Simon Callow as Mark Varda
 Miriam Margolyes as Jane Powell
 Joanne Whalley as Mary Hall
 Michael Byrne as Leonard Scruby
 Jennie Stoller as Bill's Friend
 Johanna Kirby as Bill's Friend
 Stephen Fry as Creighton
 Clifford Rose as Judge
 Harry Grubb as Christopher Hooper
 Tom Jamieson as Roger's Son

References

External links
 
 
 

1985 films
1985 drama films
1980s English-language films
Films directed by Mike Newell
Films based on British novels
1980s British films
British drama television films